Stefan Mladenović (born June 28, 1990) is a Serbian-Dutch professional basketball player, who last played for Rabotnički. He spent several years playing in the Netherlands, winning the national championship in 2017.

Early life
Mladenović was born in Belgrade, Serbia. He and his family moved to Groningen, Netherlands, when he was 8. He also holds Macedonian citizenship.

Professional career
Mladenović spent four seasons with Donar, during three different periods. In the 2016–17 season, he won the Dutch Basketball League with Donar.

International career 
Mladenović made his debut for the Netherlands men's national basketball team on 19 July 2013 against Switzerland. He played in a total of seven national team games over his career.

References

1990 births
Living people
Aris Leeuwarden players
Basketball players from Belgrade
Den Helder Kings players
Donar (basketball club) players
Dutch men's basketball players
KK Rabotnički players
Matrixx Magixx players
Feyenoord Basketball players
Serbian expatriate basketball people in the Netherlands
Serbian expatriate basketball people in North Macedonia
Serbian men's basketball players
Guards (basketball)